Craig McGuffie (born 15 December 1997) is a Scottish footballer who plays as a midfielder for Falkirk.

Career
McGuffie came through the Ayr United Football Academy. In January 2015, he signed with Glenafton Athletic on a loan deal that lasted until the end of the 2014–15 season. He spent the majority of the following season at Glenafton again, having signed another one-year loan deal in August 2015, but returned to Ayr United to make his debut in the SPFL, coming on as an 87th-minute substitute for Alan Forrest in a 1–0 defeat to Albion Rovers. In May 2016, McGuffie signed a new year-long deal, keeping him at the club until the end of the 2016–17 season. During this season, McGuffie continued to make more appearances off the bench as he had impressed manager Ian McCall with his under-20s performances.

McGuffie started his first game for Ayr on 23 July 2016, against Edinburgh City in the Scottish League Cup, and followed this up with his first goal for the club in another League Cup win, this time over Livingston. It would prove to be a breakthrough season for McGuffie but an unimpressive season for Ayr. The club were relegated on the final day of the season, but had a good run in the Scottish Cup, reaching the quarter-finals where they were knocked out by Hibernian. McGuffie scored a brilliant 25 yard goal which would eventually be crowned goal of the competition.

In the 2017–18 season McGuffie started off by scoring in a 6–1 demolition of Annan Athletic. He played a bit part role mainly coming on as a substitute, but found it hard to break in to the free scoring side. He did make an impact coming on against Queen's Park and scoring a brace in a 4–1 win for Ayr. He followed this up by playing the role of super-sub when he scored a late equaliser against Arbroath. This goal proved crucial as it sent Ayr to the top of the table on goal difference.

On 24 January 2019, McGuffie moved on loan to Raith Rovers until the end of the season. McGuffie signed for Greenock Morton on 30 January 2020, on an eighteen-month contract He then signed for Falkirk in June 2021.

Career statistics

References

External links
 
 

1997 births
Living people
Scottish footballers
Association football midfielders
Ayr United F.C. players
Glenafton Athletic F.C. players
Raith Rovers F.C. players
Greenock Morton F.C. players
Scottish Professional Football League players
Scottish Junior Football Association players
Falkirk F.C. players